Charming Kitten (other aliases include APT35 (by Mandiant), Phosphorus (by Microsoft), Ajax Security (by FireEye), NewsBeef (by Kaspersky,)) is an Iranian government cyberwarfare group, described by several companies and government officials as an advanced persistent threat.

On December 15, 2017, the group was designated by FireEye as a nation state-based advanced persistent threat, regardless of the lack of its sophistication. Research conducted by FireEye in 2018 suggested that APT35 may be expanding their malware capabilities and intrusion campaigns.

The group has since been known to use phishing to impersonate company websites, as well as fake accounts and fake DNS domains to phish users' passwords.

History

Witt Defection (Early 2013)
In 2013, former United States Air Force technical sergeant and military intelligence defense contractor Monica Witt defected to Iran knowing she might incur criminal charges by the United Stages for doing so. Her giving of intelligence to the government of Iran later caused Operation Saffron Rose, a cyberwarfare operation that targeted US military contractors.

HBO cyberattack (2017)
In 2017, following a cyberattack on HBO, a large-scale joint investigation was launched on the grounds that confidential information was being leaked. A conditional statement by a hacker going by alias Sokoote Vahshat (Persian  lit. 'Silence of Fear') said that if money was not paid, scripts of television episodes, including episodes of Game of Thrones, would be leaked. The hack caused a leak of 1.5 terabytes of data, some of which was shows and episodes that had not been broadcast at the time. HBO has since stated that it would take steps to make sure that they would not be breached again.

Behzad Mesri was subsequently indicted for the hack. He has since been alleged to be part of the operation unit that had leaked confidential information.

According to Certfa, Charming Kitten had targeted US officials involved with the 2015 Iran Nuclear Deal. The Iranian government denied any involvement.

Second Indictment (2019)
A federal grand jury in the United States District Court for the District of Columbia indicted Witt on espionage charges (specifically "conspiracy to deliver and delivering national defense information to representatives of the Iranian government").  The indictment was unsealed on February 19, 2019. In the same indictment, four Iranian nationals—Mojtaba Masoumpour, Behzad Mesri, Hossein Parvar and Mohamad Paryar—were charged with conspiracy, attempting to commit computer intrusion, and aggravated identity theft, for a campaign in 2014 and 2015 that sought to compromise the data of Witt's former co-workers.

In March 2019, Microsoft took ownership of 99 DNS domains owned by the Iranian government-sponsored hackers, in a move intended to decrease the risk of spear-phishing and other cyberattacks.

2020 Election interference attempts (2019)
According to Microsoft, in a 30-day period between August and September 2019, Charming Kitten made 2,700 attempts to gain information regarding targeted email accounts. This resulted in 241 attacks and 4 compromised accounts. Although the initiative was deemed to have been aimed at a United States presidential campaign, none of the compromised accounts were related to the election.

Microsoft did not reveal who specifically was targeted, but a subsequent report by Reuters claimed it was Donald Trump's re-election campaign. This assertion is corroborated by the fact that only the Trump campaign used Microsoft Outlook as an email client.

Iran denied any involvement in election meddling, with the Iranian Foreign Minister Mohammad Javad Zarif stating "We don’t have a preference in your election [the United States] to intervene in that election," and "We don’t interfere in the internal affairs of another country," in an interview on NBC's "Meet The Press".

Cybersecurity experts at Microsoft and third-party firms such as ClearSky Cyber Security maintain that Iran, specifically Charming Kitten, was behind the attempted interference, however. In October 2019, ClearSky released a report supporting Microsoft's initial conclusion. In the report, details about the cyberattack were compared to those of previous attacks known to originate from Charming Kitten. The following similarities were found:

 Similar victim profiles. Those targeted fell into similar categories. They were all people of interest to Iran in the fields of academia, journalism, human rights activism, and political opposition.  
 Time overlap. Verified Charming Kitten activity was ramping up within the same timeframe that the election interference attempts were made.  
 Consistent attack vectors. The methods of attack were similar, with the malicious agents relying on spear-phishing via SMS texts.

2022 HYPERSCRAPE, APT data extraction tool (2021) 
On August 23, 2022, a Google Threat Analysis Group (TAG) blog post revealed a new tool developed by Charming Kitten to steal data from well-known email providers (i.e. Google, Yahoo!, and Microsoft). This tool needs the target's credentials to create a session on its behalf. It acts in such a way that using old-style mail services looks normal to the server and downloads the victim's emails, and does some changes to hide its fingerprint.

Per the report, the tool is developed on the windows platform but not for the victim's machine. It uses both command line and GUI to enter credentials or other required resources like cookies.

See also

Sony Pictures hack
Monica Witt

References

Iranian advanced persistent threat groups
Iran–United States relations
Cyberwarfare